Hierapolis /ˌhaɪəˈræpəlɪs/ ( Ierapolis) was a town of the Phrygian Pentapolis in ancient Phrygia, inhabited during Roman and Byzantine times. 

Its site is located near Koçhisar in Asiatic Turkey.

References

Populated places in Phrygia
Former populated places in Turkey
Roman towns and cities in Turkey
Populated places of the Byzantine Empire
History of Afyonkarahisar Province
Sandıklı District